The Corps Suevia Freiburg is one of the oldest German Student Corps, a Studentenverbindung or student corporation founded by 13 students at the Albert Ludwigs University of Freiburg on June 21, 1815. As a member of the Freiburger Senioren Convent (SC) it is a founding member of the Kösener Senioren-Convents-Verband (KSCV, est. 1848), the oldest fraternity association in Germany, Austria and Switzerland.

Suevia is committed to the principles of brotherhood, tolerance, scholarship and academic excellence. Its members are required to practice academic fencing. Corps Suevia is open to applicants of every nation, ethnic background, religious or political belief. Applicants have to be honourable men and have to accept the guiding principle of democracy, which is one of the main pillars of Suevia's constitution.

Its members wear couleur (a cap and a ribbon), on official occasions. Suevia's Latin motto is "Virtute constanti fulget salus!".

External links

Suevia
1815 establishments in Germany
Student organizations established in 1815
University of Freiburg alumni